The National Housing Authority (EKB) is a government agency under the supervision of the Albanian Ministry of Infrastructure and Energy. Its scope of activity deals with financing and addressing the housing needs of the population.

References

Authority
Housing